Bashful Anton (Swedish: Blyge Anton) is a 1940 Swedish comedy film directed by Emil A. Lingheim and starring Edvard Persson, Ingrid Luterkort and Britta Brunius.

The film's art direction was by Max Linder.

Cast
 Edvard Persson as Karl Anton Malm  
 Ingrid Luterkort as Mildred Andersson  
 Britta Brunius as Kätie Melin  
 Karl-Arne Holmsten as Arne Boman  
 Fritiof Billquist as Director Stengård  
 Torsten Winge as Baron Gyllenflycht  
 Eric Malmberg as Director Kjellberg  
 Elvin Ottoson as Werner  
 Axel Lindberg as Ekberg  
 Arthur Fischer as Ågren  
 Elly Christiansson as Dolly 
 Eric Dahlström as Gårdman  
 Frithiof Hedvall as Albrechtsson  
 Astrid Lindgren as Stina  
 Aurore Palmgren as Beata  
 Sussi Adolfi as Little Girl 
 Björn Berglund as Speaker at Rifle Foundation Meeting 
 Astrid Bodin as Lady at the Bus  
 Helga Brofeldt as Angry Woman in Window  
 Nils Ekstam as Member of the Board 
 Ragnar Falck as Sniper 
 Gösta Grip as Secretary 
 Jullan Jonsson as Cook 
 Sten Sture Modéen as Employee at Office  
 Karen Rasmussen as Employee at the Office  
 Edla Rothgardt as Old Cleaning Lady  
 Inger Sundberg as Young Girl  
 Kate Thunman as Cleaning Lady  
 Hugo Tranberg as Waiter  
 Gunnel Wadner as Balet Girl  
 Susanna Östberg as Karin

References

Bibliography 
 Qvist, Per Olov & von Bagh, Peter. Guide to the Cinema of Sweden and Finland. Greenwood Publishing Group, 2000.

External links 
 

1940 films
1940 comedy films
Swedish comedy films
1940s Swedish-language films
Films directed by Emil A. Lingheim
Swedish black-and-white films
1940s Swedish films